Adda Djeziri (born 3 August 1988) is a Danish-Algerian footballer who  plays for Lao team Luangprabang United.

Club career

Early career
Born in Copenhagen, Djeziri began his career with Danish club BK Frem before joining Scotland's Rangers on loan. Djeziri played in the Rangers reserve and under-19 teams until the end of the 2006–07 season with a view to a permanent deal. He would have commanded a transfer fee of around £125,000. He was part of the Rangers under-19 team which won the 2007 Scottish Youth Cup and Youth League double.

England
On 3 September 2007, Djeziri joined Ian Holloway at Leicester City on loan until December 31. On 9 January 2008 Djeziri joined South Coast based English Premier League side Portsmouth under Harry Redknapp.

Denmark
In May 2008, he signed for Hjørring, and in August 2008 moved to Vejle. While with Vejle Djeziri had a solid campaign with his club. In September 2010 once his contract had expired with Vejle he joined HB Køge on a free transfer. At HB Køge he appeared in 17 league matches, scoring a memorable goal to win the game 2-1 away at Viborg.

Return to England
After spending a month on trial in England with Blackpool Djeziri signed a one-year deal with an option for a further year with the Championship side. On 22 November 2012 Djeziri completed a loan move to Scunthorpe United where stayed until 5 January 2013. Djeziri had a trial with Birmingham City in August 2013.

Serbia
After playing for USA club Oklahoma City Energy and Algerian side ASO Chlef, Djeziri spent almost two years on free transfer. On 28 September 2017 it was announced that he moved to Serbian club Vojvodina.

Laos
In 2018 Djeziri joined Laos-based team Luangprabang United.

International career
In an interview, he stated that he wanted to represent Algeria in international competition.

References

External links

1988 births
Living people
Danish men's footballers
Danish expatriate men's footballers
Danish people of Algerian descent
Footballers from Copenhagen
Association football forwards
Boldklubben Frem players
Rangers F.C. players
Leicester City F.C. players
Portsmouth F.C. players
Vendsyssel FF players
Vejle Boldklub players
HB Køge players
Viborg FF players
Blackpool F.C. players
Scunthorpe United F.C. players
OKC Energy FC players
FK Vojvodina players
Danish Superliga players
English Football League players
USL Championship players
Expatriate footballers in England
Expatriate footballers in Scotland
Expatriate soccer players in the United States
Danish expatriate sportspeople in England
Danish expatriate sportspeople in Serbia
Danish expatriate sportspeople in the United States
Danish expatriate sportspeople in Algeria
Expatriate footballers in Serbia
Expatriate footballers in Algeria
Danish expatriate sportspeople in Scotland
Expatriate footballers in Laos
Danish expatriate sportspeople in Laos